Peter Paul Wyngarde (born Cyril Goldbert, 23 August 1927 – 15 January 2018) was a British television, stage and film actor active from the late 1940s to the mid 1990s. He was best known for portraying the character Jason King, a bestselling novelist turned sleuth, in two television series: Department S (1969–70) and Jason King (1971–72). His flamboyant dress sense and stylish performances led to success, and he was considered a style icon in Britain and elsewhere in the early 1970s.

Background and early life
Peter Wyngarde's birth name was Cyril Goldbert. His full name may have been Cyril Louis Goldbert.

According to his own account, he was born on 23 August 1933 to a French mother and a British father at an aunt's home in Marseille, France.

Like many actors and other celebrities, Wyngarde changed his name and claimed to be younger than he was. He also cited a false family background by changing his father's name and profession and both his parents' nationalities and their ethnic origins, and he would also fabricate a false education and work history of his early years in the UK. He maintained these versions of his biography until his death at 90 in 2018. The Guardian newspaper said in March 2020 that "his life story is shrouded in mystery".

Date and place of birth

His 2018 death certificate states that he was born on 23 August 1927. Most reports of his death in January 2018 concur and say that he was 90 years old when he died. A biography published in 2020 which claimed to draw on personal knowledge of the subject gave his date of birth as 28 (not 23) August 1928. Most formal official sources cite 1927 as his year of birth, but other more informal sources have reported a range of birth years from 1924 to 1937. In a 1993 interview Wyngarde claimed not to know his own age.

His death certificate records his birthplace as Singapore and on immigration documents related to two trips to the United States in 1960 Wyngarde stated his place of birth was Singapore. However, during a subsequent visit to Singapore in 1972 he denied having previously been there. Throughout his life Wyngarde always cited Marseille as his place of birth, and this is repeated in the biography published in 2020.

Family

Passenger records of Peter Wyngarde's journey to the UK in 1945 and a biography published in 2020 name his father as a British merchant seaman called Henry Goldbert (1897–1945). Henry Goldbert was of Russian ethnicity and born in present day Ukraine. He grew up in British Malaya, where he became a naturalised British citizen. Wyngarde had claimed that Henry Goldbert was his stepfather, and that his birth father was an Englishman named Henry Wyngarde who had a prestigious career in the British Diplomatic Service in Hong Kong, Malaya, Singapore and India, before becoming an importer-exporter of antique watches living in Eaton Square, London. No such person appears in any public records in the UK or anywhere in the world. Despite being named as Wyngarde's next of kin on the passenger manifest, Henry Goldbert appears to have died in the US in October 1945, a few weeks before his son arrived in the UK from Shanghai.

Peter Wyngarde's mother was Margherita Goldbert,  Ahin (1908–1992), known as Madge. In interviews he always said she was French. She appears to have been born to a Eurasian family from Singapore. She and Henry Goldbert divorced in 1937.

Wyngarde had two younger siblings: Henry Goldbert Jr, known as Joe (1930–2011) and Marion Goldbert Wells (1932–2012). They would move to England in 1946, shortly after Wyngarde did, but the 2020 biography says that he chose to have very little further contact with them or their children. Henry Jr's sons were executors of Wyngarde's estate, possibly against his wishes.

After Peter Wyngarde's parents divorced, his mother is said to have married Charles Léo Juvet of the Shanghai-based Swiss horological family through whom she gained Swiss citizenship. His stepfather appears to have inspired Wyngarde's later claims that his father was a dealer of antique watches, and that he was a maternal nephew of the French actor-director Louis Jouvet. Madge MacAulay does not appear to have been Louis Jouvet's sister or sister-in-law and moreover the French Louis Jouvet appears to be unrelated to the Swiss Juvet family.

In 1947 Madge married John MacAulay, known as Ian, in Shanghai, at which time her legal name was recorded as her first married name Marcheritta [sic] Goldbert. She lived in Johor, Malaysia until her husband retired and they moved to his home town of Stornoway, Scotland. After his mother's marriage to Ian MacAulay, Wyngarde would sometimes use his stepfather's surname.

Early life

Interviewed in 1973, Wyngarde said: "As a child it was difficult to differentiate sometimes between fact and fantasy." He often spoke about his traumatic early life. Wyngarde told an interviewer that after his parents' divorce his father took him to China "only months before war with China broke out" in the summer of 1937. He spoke about living in Shanghai when the Japanese Army took over the Shanghai International Settlement on 8 December 1941. Correspondence held in the UK's National Archives shows that in 1942 Henry Goldbert's three children including 15-year-old Cyril were living in Shanghai and that efforts were being made by the UK's Ministry of War Transport, the Prisoners of War Department and various boarding schools to facilitate the children's repatriation to the UK, but that Cyril could not be accommodated because of his age.

In April 1943, he was interned in the Lunghua civilian internment camp. In one interview in the 1970s, Wyngarde says that he was interned as an unaccompanied 5-year-old due to an administrative error, but this appears to be age fabrication since records show that he was interned from age 15 to just before his 18th birthday. He began acting during his internment when he played all the characters in a version of Doctor Jekyll and Mr Hyde.

Following the Surrender of Japan, the internment camps were liberated in August 1945. Cyril Goldbert left Shanghai that autumn and travelled to the UK on the Cunard-White Star Line ship Arawa. Passenger records show that he travelled alone, aged 18, and arrived in Southampton on 14 December 1945. He later claimed that the ship had arrived in Liverpool not Southampton, and that he was personally greeted by King George VI.

The British author J. G. Ballard was also interned at the Lunghua camp and he travelled to the UK with Wyngarde and other former internees. In 1995, he wrote:

Wyngarde always denied knowing Ballard or said he could not remember, but in an undated letter published by his biographer in 2020 he confirms that he knew Ballard.

His own accounts of his life after leaving Shanghai for England appear to have been embellished with a prestigious and false history of education, travel and work. In part, this helped account for the six-year gap created by his claim to have been a 12-year-old boy when he left Shanghai, not a man of 18 as the passenger manifest says. He claimed to have spent two years in a Swiss sanatorium recovering from his war experiences before attending public schools in England, France and/or Switzerland, after which he claimed to have studied in the Faculty of Law, University of Oxford for three months, and to have worked in a London advertising agency for a while before starting work as a professional actor. Little or none of this can be true because it is clear that Wyngarde arrived in the UK from Shanghai aged 18 in December 1945 and began his professional acting career in early 1946 just a few months later.

Career

Early acting career
Having changed his name from Cyril Goldbert to Peter Wyngarde on arrival in the UK in December 1945, within a few months he began his professional acting career. He first appeared at the Buxton Playhouse in 1946, and the following year in a production of Noël Coward's Present Laughter at the Theatre Royal, Birmingham. He appeared with Alec Guinness in Hamlet in London in 1951, and with Siobhán McKenna in Saint Joan in 1954. His theatre appearances included playing opposite Vivien Leigh in 1958, and as Cyrano de Bergerac at the Bristol Old Vic in 1959, which he considered a highlight of his career.

After making his film debut in a brief, uncredited role as a soldier in Dick Barton Strikes Back (1949), Wyngarde had more roles in feature films, television plays and television series guest appearances from the mid-1950s. One of these, a television adaptation of Julien Green's novel South (1959, originally Sud), in which Wyngarde featured in a lead role, is thought to be the earliest television play with an overtly homosexual theme. He appeared as Long John Silver in an  adaptation of The Adventures of Ben Gunn (1958), and as Sir Roger Casement in an episode of Granada Television's On Trial series produced by Peter Wildeblood. He also featured in the title role of Rupert of Hentzau in 1964.

Wyngarde's film work was not extensive, but gained attention. He took the role of Pausanias opposite Richard Burton in the film Alexander the Great (1956), and appeared in the film The Siege of Sidney Street (1960) with Donald Sinden. In Jack Clayton's The Innocents (1961), he had brief unspeaking scenes as the leering Peter Quint with Deborah Kerr and Pamela Franklin. He followed this appearance as the lead in the occult thriller Night of the Eagle (US title: Burn Witch Burn, 1962), his only film appearance in a lead role.

By the late 1960s, Wyngarde was guest starring in television series of the time, many of which were shown internationally, including The Avengers, The Saint, The Baron, The Champions and I Spy. He also appeared in The Prisoner ("Checkmate", 1967) as the authority figure called Number Two. Wyngarde was also a guest star, playing himself as a Shakespearean actor in Lucy in London (1968), a prime-time TV special starring Lucille Ball.

Popular success as Jason King

Wyngarde became a British household name through his starring role in the espionage series Department S (1969). His character, Jason King,  a novelist turned sleuth, was reputedly based on the author Ian Fleming. King led a hedonistic lifestyle; he often got the girl but as she is about to kiss him manages to avoid it, much to the annoyance of co-actor Joel Fabiani. After that series ended, his character, the suave womaniser Jason King, was spun off into a new action espionage series entitled Jason King (1971), which ran for one season of 26 fifty-minute episodes.

One obituary described Wyngarde as playing the role "in the manner of a cat walking on tiptoe, with an air of self-satisfaction", but that increasingly his acting became more mannered and he came to believe his own publicity. His director, Cyril Frankel, said: "It got to a point where he wouldn't accept direction." Frankel also said: "He was a very fine actor, but unfortunately a difficult person."

The series led Wyngarde to briefly become an international celebrity, being mobbed by female fans in Australia. Carl Gresham, his promotional manager at this time said later that "During the '70s we had a contract to officially open over 30 Woolworths newly refurbished stores throughout the UK. Other than my friends and clients, Morecambe & Wise, Peter was the most requested and highest paid celebrity making personal appearances."

In the role, he "became a style icon, with his droopy moustache, hair that looked like a bearskin hat and a wardrobe of wide-lapelled, three-piece suits, cravats and open-necked shirts in colours so bright they might hurt sensitive eyes." In 1970, he was described as "Britain's best-dressed male personality", and the following year it was reported that more babies were christened Jason that year than ever before.

Later career
In 1974, Wyngarde played the lead role of the King of Siam in a stage revival of The King and I, initially with Sally Ann Howes as Anna, which ran for 260 performances at the Adelphi Theatre in London.

In the late 1970s, he performed in the theatre in South Africa and Austria. Also on stage he appeared in the thriller Underground with Raymond Burr and Marc Sinden (whose father Donald had worked with Wyngarde on The Siege of Sidney Street) at the Royal Alexandra Theatre, Toronto and at the Prince of Wales Theatre, London in 1983.

Wyngarde played the masked character Klytus in the film Flash Gordon (1980) and Sir Robert Knight in the film Tank Malling (1989) with Ray Winstone. On TV he appeared in The Two Ronnies 1984 Christmas Special as Sir Guy. Other TV appearances include Doctor Who (in the four-episode-story Planet of Fire, 1984), Hammer House of Mystery and Suspense (1984), Bulman (1985), The Lenny Henry Show (1994) and The Memoirs of Sherlock Holmes (1994).

After leaving a 1995 stage production of The Cabinet of Dr Caligari due to a throat infection while still in previews, Wyngarde mostly stopped acting except for occasional voice work. He continued to appear in public at Memorabilia and other events celebrating his performances. In 2003 he appeared as a guest of Simon Dee in the Channel 4 one-off revival of his chat show Dee Time.

Screenwriter Mark Millar says that when casting his 2004 film Layer Cake, the director Matthew Vaughn wanted Wyngarde for a role, but was told that he had died. Seven years later, Vaughn requested him again for a role in X-Men: First Class but was again wrongly advised that Wyngarde had died.

In 2007, Wyngarde participated in recording extras for a box-set of The Prisoner, including a mock interview segment titled "The Pink Prisoner".

In January 2014, he narrated an episode of the BBC Four Timeshift documentary strand How to Be Sherlock Holmes: The Many Faces of a Master Detective. In It was Alright in the 1960s, a 2015 documentary series for Channel 4, Wyngarde expressed his unease at having had to don blackface to play a Turk in The Saint, but said he had done it only in the hope that a theatre director might pick him to play Othello.

Recordings
In 1970, Wyngarde recorded an album released by RCA Victor entitled simply Peter Wyngarde, featuring a single, "La Ronde De L'Amour"/"The Way I Cry Over You". The album is a collection of spoken-word musical arrangements produced by Vic Smith and Hubert Thomas Valverde. Wyngarde claimed that: "It sold out in next to no time... but RCA point-blankly refused to press any more. I was fuming, as I'd been given a three-album contract with the company, who promised to release one LP every 12 months. The excuse was that production was being moved... They told me that everything would have to go on the back burner, but I just believe that they got cold feet". A promo single of the track "Rape" (re-titled "Peter Wyngarde Commits Rape") was also issued in 1970 with the B-side "The Way I Cry Over You" and the serial number PW1.

In 1998, the album was reissued on CD by RPM Records, re-titled When Sex Leers Its Inquisitive Head. The album is now usually treated as a curiosity because of its unusual spoken-word style and the controversial subject matter of some of the tracks.

Personal life
Peter Wyngarde married the actress Dorinda Stevens on 6 March 1951 when he was 23. They lived at 9 Holland Park, Kensington. They separated after three years and by November 1955, Stevens was described in a TV Times profile as "a bachelor girl, sharing a mews flat near Portland Place, London, with Cassio, her wire-haired terrier". She married the Canadian cinematographer William Michael Boultbee (1933–2005) in Nairobi in 1957 while filming for African Patrol.

Interviewed for The Sydney Morning Herald in 1972, Wyngarde said his biggest regret was that he "married far too young", adding: "It lasted three [sic] years and the last year was pretty hell. However, one just goes on learning from one's mistakes doesn't one?"

He called Vivien Leigh "the love of my life". From 1956 to 1958, Wyngarde shared a flat with Ruby Talbot in London and the 2020 biography cites the electoral roll as evidence that this was a romantic relationship.

In the late 1950s he moved to a flat in number 1 Earls Terrace off Kensington High Street in London. He would live in the same building for the rest of his life. He shared a flat there for some years with fellow actor Alan Bates and according to some sources this was a romantic relationship. It was always assumed within the acting community that Wyngarde was gay and while the nickname Petunia Winegum is often quoted it may have originated in a comedy sketch rather than being a genuine nickname.

In July 1974, Jeremy Dallas-Cope, a 23-year-old described as Wyngarde's former "male secretary and personal assistant", was found guilty at his trial at the Old Bailey and sentenced to two years' imprisonment, for forging nearly £3,000 worth of cheques from the actor's bank account. Upon the fraud scheme being discovered Dallas-Cope persuaded his flatmate Anthony O'Donoghue, a male model, "to attempt suicide and take the blame". O'Donoghue was found by police when close to death, and was sentenced to 15 months, after also being found guilty.

Public attention was drawn to Wyngarde's personal life in October 1975 when he was prosecuted under his real name, Cyril Goldbert, for gross indecency with a crane driver in public toilets in Gloucester bus station. The Evening Standard reported that Wyngarde pleaded guilty although his solicitor  tried to mitigate the charge as a "mental aberration" brought on by excessive drinking. Wyngarde was convicted and fined £75. It is said that Wyngarde's career never fully recovered from the publicity surrounding this prosecution.

Wyngarde told an interviewer in 1993 that he was an alcoholic and that at the height of his fame "I drank myself to a standstill ... I am amazed I am still here", but that he stopped drinking in the early 1980s. He was declared bankrupt in 1982 and again in 1988. An obituary reported that he lived partly on social security benefits.

Wyngarde and the singer Morrissey were friends. Morrissey wrote in his 2013 autobiography about visiting Wyngarde at home in Earls Terrace:

Fandom, biographies
Peter Wyngarde had an active fan club from the mid-1950s to 1985. An appreciation society called The Hellfire Club was founded in 1992 with the actor's support, with members receiving its quarterly magazine by post. It went online in 2000, and maintains a regularly updated blog.

A biography of the actor was published in 2012 by the organiser of the Six of One, the appreciation society of The Prisoner TV series. It was reissued in 2019.

The organiser of The Hellfire Club, formerly Tina Bate, took Wyngarde's surname after his death, becoming Tina Wyngarde-Hopkins, and in 2020 she published a biography which claimed to draw on personal knowledge of the subject.

Death and legacy
His agent and manager reported that Wyngarde was admitted to the Chelsea and Westminster Hospital in London in October 2017 with an unspecified illness. He died on 15 January 2018.

Tina Wyngarde-Hopkins's 2020 biography of Wyngarde and its accompanying website detail some disputes and conflict between the author and Wyngarde's executors and next of kin over his estate and the location of his remains.

An auction of 250 items from his estate took place on 26 March 2020. All items sold, and the auction fetched over £35,000. His trophy for "best dressed personality of 1970" reached the highest selling price with a winning bid of £2,200.

Mike Myers credited Wyngarde with inspiring the character Austin Powers.

Partial filmography

 Dick Barton Strikes Back (1949) – soldier (uncredited)
 Alexander the Great (1956) – Pausanias
 The Siege of Sidney Street (1960) – Peter
 The Innocents (1961) – Peter Quint
 Night of the Eagle (1962) – Norman Taylor
  (1979) – Scheich Al-Abdullah
 Flash Gordon (1980) – Klytus
 Tank Malling (1989, also released as Beyond Soho) – Sir Robert Knight

Selected television appearances

 BBC adaptation of A Tale of Two Cities (as Sydney Carton, 1957)
 The Adventures of Ben Gunn (from the novel by R. F. Delderfield, 1958)
 South (1959) based on the play 'Sud' by Julien Green
 Rupert of Hentzau (1964)
 Sherlock Holmes in "The Illustrious Client" (as Baron Gruner, 1965)
 The Saint (two episodes, 1966–67)
 The Avengers (two episodes, 1966–67)
 The Prisoner: "Checkmate" (as Number Two, 1967)
 The Champions: "The Invisible Man" (as Dr John Hallam, 1968)
 Department S (as Jason King, 1969–70)
 Jason King (1971–72)
 Doctor Who: "Planet of Fire" (as Timanov, 1984)
 Bulman: Series 1 Episode 11 "I Met a Man Who Wasn't There"  as Gallio 
 Memoirs of Sherlock Holmes in "The Three Gables" (as Langdale Pike, 1994)

Notes

References

External links

 Peter Wyngarde Appreciation Society
 Peter Wyngarde at the British Film Institute
 
 
 

1920s births
2018 deaths
Year of birth uncertain
20th-century British male actors
British male film actors
British male television actors
English Jews
World War II civilian prisoners held by Japan
English gay actors
Age controversies
RCA Records artists
Male actors from London
Jewish British male actors